Lieutenant General Abid Al-Hamid Mahmud al-Tikriti (21 September 1957  – 7 June 2012) was an Iraqi military officer and Saddam Hussein's personal secretary.

Biography
Mahmud began his military career as a non-commissioned officer in the Iraqi Army. He rose through the ranks to Lieutenant General, becoming part of Saddam Hussein's personal bodyguard, and finally, his personal secretary.

A distant cousin of Saddam Hussein, observers regarded Mahmud as being Hussein's right-hand man. He always maintained constant contact with Hussein and acted as a gatekeeper, controlling access to him. He was trusted, along with Saddam's son Qusay Hussein, in overseeing the Iraqi Special Security Organization.

He was designated ace of diamonds in the U.S. administration's most-wanted Iraqi playing cards and fourth on the most-wanted list after Saddam and his sons Uday and Qusay.

He was captured in a joint raid by members of B Squadron Delta Force and G Squadron SAS and the 1st Battalion, 22nd Infantry Regiment of 1st Brigade, 4th Infantry Division, in Tikrit on 16 June 2003. At the time it was recognized as the "greatest success" since the end of major hostilities, and a sign that Saddam Hussein might soon be found.

On 29 April 2008, he appeared before the Iraq Special Tribunal set up by the Iraq Interim Government and stood trial with six others including Tariq Aziz, Ali Hassan al-Majid, Watban Ibrahim al-Hassan and Sabbawi Ibrahim al-Hassan.

On 26 October 2010, he was sentenced to death by the Iraqi High Tribunal after being found guilty of crimes against humanity and genocide for organising a crackdown against banned political parties in Iraq in the 1980s and 1990s, including assassinations and unlawful detentions.

On 7 June 2012, he was executed by hanging, according to a spokesman of the Iraqi Ministry of Justice.

References

External links
 
 
 

1957 births
2012 deaths
Prisoners and detainees of the United States military
21st-century executions by Iraq
Arab Socialist Ba'ath Party – Iraq Region politicians
Executed Iraqi people
People executed by Iraq by hanging
Iraqi generals
Iraqi people convicted of crimes against humanity
Iraqi people convicted of genocide
People executed for crimes against humanity
Executed mass murderers
Most-wanted Iraqi playing cards
Iraq War prisoners of war
Iraqi prisoners of war